The Vii is a right tributary of the river Glavacioc in Romania. It discharges into the Glavacioc in Puranii de Sus.

References

Rivers of Romania
Rivers of Teleorman County